Marine Conservation Institute (formerly Marine Conservation Biology Institute) is a tax-exempt nonprofit ocean conservation organization working to identify and protect vulnerable ocean ecosystems worldwide. The organization is headquartered in Seattle, Washington with offices in Washington D.C. and Glen Ellen, California.

Marine Conservation Institute is a U.S. based nonprofit organization. Marine Conservation Institute is a four-star Charity Navigator rated organization.

Previous names
Marine Conservation Biology Institute, 1996-2011

History
Marine Conservation Institute was founded under the name Marine Conservation Biology Institute (MCBI) in 1996 by Dr. Elliott Norse, a biologist who had previously worked at the Council on Environmental Quality and the Ocean Conservancy.

MCBI's focus was initially to make connections between scientists and policymakers.  In 2000 letter written to President Clinton, a request was made to establish a national system of marine protected areas (MPAs), which led to Executive Order 13158 on Marine Protected Areas. In 2004, MCBI co-founded the Deep Sea Conservation Coalition  and released the Scientists’ Statement on Protecting the World's Deep Sea Coral and Sponge Ecosystems, signed by 1,136 scientists from 69 countries. (The statement was later reopened to signing, and the number of signers increased to 1,452 in 2006.)

In 2005, Elliott Norse was the lead editor and co-author of Marine Conservation Biology: The Science of Maintaining the Sea's Biodiversity, the first textbook focused on the science of marine conservation, published by Island Press.

A consistent theme of the organization was the threat of deep-sea bottom trawling fisheries to coral habitats and other sensitive sea floors. In 2007 MCBI led a joint statement at the American Association for the Advancement of Science meeting calling for the abolition of subsidies that permit deep-sea trawling, which built on the previous scientists' statement.

In January 2009, MCBI was praised for its work in the designation of three large marine national monument in the U.S. territories of the Pacific Ocean by President George W. Bush. In "Green Bush: The departing president tries to burnish his environmental halo," The Economist wrote, "much of the scientific donkey-work and lobbying behind Mr Bush's reserves was done by ... the Marine Conservation Biology Institute, in Washington. Congratulations."

In 2011, MCBI shortened its name to Marine Conservation Institute. A paper in Marine Policy expanded on the organization's long-term emphasis on threats posed by bottom trawling, generated substantial media attention. In the Washington Post, the paper generated the headline "Scientists call for end to deep-sea fishing," citing the evidence of extensive damage to bottom habitats.

In 2012 Dr. Norse resigned as President, becoming Chief Scientist, and Dr. Lance E. Morgan took the role of President. On World Oceans Day in June 2012, Marine Conservation Institute announced the launch of the MPAtlas, a global searchable database of marine protected area sites funded by the Waitt Foundation, headed by Ted Waitt.

In May 2013, Marine Conservation Institute and Sylvia Earle's organization Mission Blue released "SeaStates.US 2013: How Well Does Your State Protect Your Coastal Waters?" a report on US states and territories and the percentage of the state marine waters that are established as a "no-take" marine reserve, in which no fishing, energy extraction, or other uses are permitted. The report showed that 15 of the 23 US coastal states and territories had zero square kilometers as "no-take" reserves, and that only one state - Hawaii exceeded 20% as no-take reserves. California and the US Virgin Islands were the only other states or territories that exceeded 5%.

In October 2013, Marine Conservation Institute initiated the Global Ocean Refuge System (renamed to [Blue Parks), a strategic, science-based way to safeguard marine ecosystems on a global scale. Blue Park recognition is awarded to outstanding marine protected areas that effectively limit damaging human activities and can demonstrate design, management, monitoring and enforcement that leads to biodiversity conservation.

In 2017, the first three Blue Parks were awarded at the International Marine Protected Areas Congress in Chile; Papahānaumokuākea Marine National Monument in the USA, Santuario de Flora y Fauna Malpelo in Colombia, Tubbataha Reefs Natural Park in the Philippines. At the end of 2019, 16 sites had been recognized as Blue Parks covering nearly 1.6 million sq km of ocean, including such notable places as the Northern Channel Islands in California and Cocos Island National Park in Costa Rica.

Funding sources

Marine Conservation Institute draws funding from private foundations, individual donors, corporations, and government agencies. In 2011, according to its IRS Form 990, the organization had $1,792,140 in revenue.

Programs
Marine Conservation Institute's work falls under three broad themes, Identifying Vulnerable Marine Ecosystems, Advocating for Healthy Oceans, and Protecting Wild Places. In this way, Marine Conservation Institute bridges the gap between marine science and policy – with an aim toward achieving the oceans’ biological diversity and sustainable productivity.

Following are the current focus areas of Marine Conservation Institute.

]
 Blue Parks initiative
 Marine Protected Area (MPA) designations
 Coral Conservation
 Sustainable Fishing
 High Seas Conservation
 Marine Protected Areas (MPAs)
 Ocean Acidification
 Ocean Governance
 Enforcement

Board of directors
 Chair, David Johns
 Vice Chair, Nathalie Udo
 Treasurer, Jeff Smith
 President, Lance E. Morgan, Ph.D.
 Founder, Elliott A. Norse, Ph.D.
 Sylvia Earle, Ph.D.
 Sam Dakin
 Sebastian Nicholls
 Steve Olson, PhD
 Gail Osherenko

See also

Sustainability
Marine Conservation

References

External links
 Marine Conservation Institute homepage
 Marine Protected Area Atlas, MPAtlas
 SeaStates.US 2013: How Well Does Your State Protect Your Coastal Waters?
 Blue Parks homepage

Fisheries conservation organizations
Organizations established in 1996
Environmental organizations based in Washington (state)
Marine conservation organizations